Sadaf is a name. Notable people with the name include:

Given name
 Sadaf Foroughi (born 1976), Iranian filmmaker, video artist and film editor
 Sadaf Hussain, Pakistani cricketer
 Sadaf Malaterre, Pakistani fashion designer
 Sadaf Rahimi, Afghani female boxer
 Sadaf Siddiqui (born 1985), Pakistani track and field sprint athlete 
 Sadaf Taherian (born 1988), Iranian actress and model

Surname
 Gulraiz Sadaf (born 1989), Pakistani cricketer 
 Sidra Sadaf,  Pakistani female cyclist